John Wick is a fictional character created by Derek Kolstad, and the titular protagonist of the neo-noir action thriller film series John Wick, portrayed by Keanu Reeves. John is a legendary hitman who had retired until a gang invades his house, steals his car, and kills the puppy that his late wife Helen had given him. This sets him on a path of revenge, returning him to the criminal underworld and eventually coming into conflict with the international organization of assassins of which he was once a part.

Fictional character biography
John was born Jardani Jovanovich (Russian: Джордани Йованович, Belarusian: Ярдані Яванавіч) in Padhorje, Byelorussian SSR, Soviet Union on September 12, 1964. He was orphaned at a young age before being taken in by an old friend of his father, who would eventually become John's mentor. It is revealed in the John Wick comic book mini-series that he spent a significant portion of his adolescence in El Sauzel, Mexico. At one point, he was recruited by a Ruska Roma organized crime group and trained by its leader, a woman known as "the Director", in New York City. Under the Director's supervision, John was trained as a hitman and learned skills including martial arts, firearms and other weaponry, tactical driving, infiltration, escapology, and more. After leaving the Ruska Roma organization, he was arrested for an unspecified crime and incarcerated. Upon release, he was manipulated into joining the underground crime world operating out of the Continental Hotel chain. John eventually became the top enforcer for the New York Russian crime syndicate, becoming a feared and ruthless hitman that people describe as "a man of focus, commitment, and sheer will". He was later nicknamed "Baba Yaga", being further described as the man one would send to "kill the Bogeyman". His prowess was such that he once single-handedly killed three men in a bar with a pencil.

Eventually, John fell in love with a woman named Helen. Hoping to leave his past as a contract killer behind him and pursue a normal life, he met with Viggo Tarasov, boss of the Tarasov mob, who agreed to grant him his freedom if he could carry out what was described as an "impossible task", implying that Wick was not expected to survive the mission. In order to accomplish his goal, Wick requested assistance from crime boss Santino D'Antonio and subsequently ended up owing him a blood oath called a "marker". John eliminated all of Tarasov's major rivals, thus enabling him to become one of New York's most powerful crime bosses. John retired and settled down with Helen, his reputation now legendary, and the two lived happily together for five years.

Returning from retirement 

Following Helen's death from a terminal illness, John largely remains isolated from society. He spends his days driving his prized 1969 Ford Mustang Boss 429 and caring for his new dog, a beagle pup named Daisy, the last gift from his deceased wife. When Iosef Tarasov, Viggo's son, breaks into his home, assaults John, steals his car and kills Daisy, the vengeful John goes on a violent rampage. Knowing that John will likely stop at nothing to kill Iosef, Viggo attempts to protect his son and sends numerous assassins to stop John, but he kills them all. John eventually kills both Iosef and Viggo. Afterwards, John rescues a pit bull puppy scheduled to be euthanized from an animal shelter and returns home.

Completing his blood oath 

After taking revenge on the Tarasovs, John retrieves his prized car from Viggo's brother, Abram, and forms a truce with him. Wick's hopes of returning to retirement are ruined by Camorra crime boss Santino D'Antonio, who demands he complete his blood oath and assassinate Santino's own sister, Gianna D'Antonio, allowing Santino to take her place at The High Table. When John refuses, Santino retaliates by destroying his house. John reluctantly travels to Rome and fulfills the oath, only to realize that Santino is targeting him to tie up loose ends. Santino sends his bodyguard Ares and Gianna's former bodyguard Cassian after John, but ultimately John kills Ares and wounds Cassian. Santino places a $7 million bounty on John's head, after which John enlists assistance from the Bowery King. John, after massacring hordes of assassins, eventually finds Santino in the Continental, where no bloodshed is permitted. John breaks the rule by killing Santino on the hotel premises, forcing Winston to declare him "excommunicado", meaning that he has been thrown out of the Continental without any way to call on it again for help. Winston, however, gives John one hour to flee before the excommunicado becomes active and the bounty on his head is doubled and offered globally by The High Table.

Excommunicated and reuniting with Sofia 

Excommunicated, exhausted, and wounded, John prepares to escape from New York as assassins gather to kill him after learning of the $14 million bounty placed on his head. Fleeing to Morocco using his former allegiances, John meets with Sofia, an old friend, manager of the Moroccan Continental, and someone whose marker John holds for rescuing Sofia's daughter. Sofia helps him find the Elder, the one man who is above the High Table itself. The Elder agrees to rescind the excommunicado in return for John killing Winston and serving the High Table for the remainder of his life. John severs his ring finger and offers his wedding ring to the Elder to prove his fealty. John then returns to New York and is pursued by assassins until he reaches the safe haven of the Continental. John reunites with Winston but decides to spare him. Instead, John and the hotel's concierge, Charon, fight against the High Table and their enforcers. Successfully defeating waves of attackers, Winston and High Table representative, the Adjudicator, have a parley on the hotel roof. Ultimately, Winston knowingly shoots John in his bulletproof jacket multiple times to restore his standing with the High Table, while not wanting to betray him, and John tumbles from the roof into the street. The Bowery King, recovering from grave wounds inflicted by the Adjudicator's assassin named Zero, retrieves the badly injured John in his hideout, where he tells John that he plans to declare war against the High Table and John agrees to join him.

Characterization
The character and franchise has been described as a "central boogeyman character who can't be killed" and a "modern, action-oriented equivalent of '80s horror franchises", and reportedly has a kill count of 306, exceeding Jason Voorhees and Michael Myers combined. Wick's violent one-man crusade has been described as an extreme case of workplace revenge. He is largely seen wearing dark colored, tailored suits outfitted with ballistic armor. He is a deadly combatant and proficient with handguns, rifles, knives, and various other forms of weaponry as well as with hand-to-hand fighting. He has a large tattoo on his back with a Latin phrase written across praying hands holding a cross that reads, .

In other media
John Wick appeared in Payday 2 as part of free tie-in content and later on the John Wick Heists DLC.

John Wick appeared as a crossover cosmetic outfit in the battle royale game Fortnite. This was the result of young players mistaking Reeves for another outfit named The Reaper.

A parody of John Wick, simply referred to as "the Boogeyman" and "the Living Blade", and visually based on a beardless Keanu Reeves, is featured in a Marvel Comics Black Widow storyline published in January 2022, written by Kelly Thompson and illustrated by Rafael T. Pimente.

References

External links

Film Locations

John Wick
Action film characters
Film characters introduced in 2014
Fictional contract killers
Fictional Belarusian people
Fictional Brazilian jiu-jitsu practitioners
Fictional escapologists
Fictional Daitō-ryū Aiki-jūjutsu practitioners
Fictional gunfighters in films
Fictional immigrants to the United States
Fictional judoka
Fictional jujutsuka
Fictional karateka
Fictional Krav Maga practitioners
Fictional marksmen and snipers
Fictional mass murderers
Fictional melee weapons practitioners
Fictional rampage and spree killers
Fictional Romani people
Fictional Soviet people
Fictional sambo practitioners
Fictional United States Marine Corps personnel
Fictional vigilantes
Fictional wushu practitioners
Martial artist characters in films
Orphan characters in film
Fictional knife-fighters